Kilukil Pambaram is a 1997 Indian Malayalam-language comedy drama film directed by Thulasidas and written by Sasidharan Arattuvazhi. The film stars Jayaram, Jagathy Sreekumar, Kalyani, Vani Viswanath and Madhupal. The film had musical score by S. P. Venkatesh.

Synopsis
Anadapadmanabhan is hired by the government as the caretaker of the palace and assets because the legal heirs are murdered and there is a dispute regarding the tenure. He must fight to make sure that the property is safe.

Cast
Jayaram as Advocate Ananthapadmanabhan
Jagathy Sreekumar as Urumis
Kalyani as Rohini
Vani Viswanath as Sugandhi
Madhupal as Chithrapuram Mohana Varma
Rajan P. Dev as Meledethu Narayana Kuruppu
Paravoor Ramachandran as Mahadeva Varma
Shivaji as Nandana Varma
Indrans as Sakshi Sadananthan
Kozhikode Narayanan Nair as Ramunni Nair
Kanakalatha as Sugandhi's mother
Kumarakom Raghunath as Advocate Sankara Narayanan
Thikkurissy Sukumaran Nair as Ananthan's grandfather
 Kalliyoor Sasi as Viswambaran

References

External links
 
 

1997 films
1990s Malayalam-language films
Films directed by Thulasidas